Pompeia (flourished 2nd and 1st century BC) was a Roman woman. She was an ancestor of the Roman emperors Augustus, Claudius, Caligula and Nero.

Biography

Early life and background
Pompeia was born and raised into a noble family in Picenum (modern Marche and Abruzzo) a rural district in Northern Italy, off the Adriatic Coast.

Pompeia's mother was a woman called Lucilia. Lucilia's family originated from Suessa Aurunca (modern Sessa Aurunca) and she was a sister of satire poet Gaius Lucilius. Lucilius was a friend of Roman general Scipio Aemilianus Africanus.

Her paternal grandfather was Gnaeus Pompeius, while her father was Sextus Pompeius. Pompeia had two elder brothers Sextus Pompeius and Gnaeus Pompeius Strabo. Through Strabo, she was a paternal aunt to triumvir Pompey and his sister Pompeia.

Marriage
Pompeia married Marcus Atius Balbus (148 BC-87 BC), a senator of plebs status from Aricia (modern Ariccia). Pompeia and Balbus had a son a younger Marcus Atius Balbus in 105 BC. Her son married Julia Minor, the younger of two sisters of dictator Gaius Julius Caesar. The younger Balbus and Julia had three daughters. Among Pompeia's descendants was the first Roman Emperor Augustus as well as all the following Julio-Claudian emperors except Tiberius.

See also 
 List of Roman women
 Women in ancient Rome

References

Sources 
 Suetonius - The Lives of the Twelve Caesars - Augustus
 Microsoft Encarta Encyclopaedia 2002

External links
 https://web.archive.org/web/20080503112904/http://www.ancientlibrary.com/smith-bio/1930.html
 http://www.ancientlibrary.com/smith-bio/2808.html
 http://www.romansonline.com/Persns.asp?IntID=664&Ename=Pompeia

2nd-century BC births
Year of death missing
2nd-century BC Roman women
1st-century BC Roman women
1st-century BC Romans
Pompeii (Romans)